Retired Emperor, Grand Emperor, or Emperor Emeritus is a title occasionally used by the monarchical regimes in the Sinosphere for former emperors who had (at least in name) abdicated voluntarily to another member of the same clan, usually their sons. This title appeared in the history of China, Japan, Korea, and Vietnam. Although technically no longer the reigning sovereign, there were instances like the Qianlong Emperor of the Qing dynasty of China or several emperors of the Trần dynasty of Vietnam, where the emperor continued to exert considerable if not more power than the reigning emperor.
Ancient Chinese institutions
Ancient_Japanese_institutions

China 

The title is named in Chinese as Taishang Huang. The title originated, however, from Liu Bang (Emperor Gao of Han)'s father Liu Taigong, who was honored as such after Liu Bang declared himself emperor in 202, even though Liu Taigong was never emperor himself.

Japan 

In Japan the title was Daijō-tennō (kanji: 太上天皇; Hepburn: daijō-tennō), or just Jōkō (kanji: 上皇; Hepburn: jōkō). In Japan, there was a political system called Cloistered rule, in which Jōkō exerted power and influence from behind the scenes even after retirement.

Korea 

In Korean the title was Sang-hwang (Hangul: 상황; Hanja: 上皇), or sometimes even Taesang-hwang (hangul: 태상황; hanja: 太上皇). After 1897, when the Joseon dynasty became the dynasty of the Korean Empire, only two emperors were still to ascend to the throne.  One was Emperor Gojong, who was forced to abdicate by the Japanese in 1907. However, he was given the title Tae-hwangje (Hangul: 태황제; Hanja: 太皇帝). Another emperor was Emperor Sunjong, but after the Japan-Korea Annexation Treaty of 1910, the Imperial Household was demoted by the Empire of Japan.

Vietnam 

In Vietnam the title was Thái thượng hoàng (Chữ Nôm: 太上皇), or just Thượng Hoàng (chữ Nôm: 上皇). Many there have been many prominent Thái thượng hoàng throughout the history of Vietnam, most of them was of the Trần dynasty, one of the golden ages of Vietnam. Trần Thái Tổ (陳太祖) was the first Thái thượng hoàng of the Trần dynasty, the father of Trần Thái Tông (陳太宗) who had great contributions to the rise of the dynasty,  was one of two Thái thượng hoàng in Vietnam's history who had not previously been Emperor. Another well-known Retired Emperor is Trần Nhân Tông (陳仁宗) of the same dynasty, whose reign was marked by multiple decisive victories over the invading Mongol-dominated Yuan dynasty, and was also the founder of Trúc Lâm Yên Tử (竹林安子), a Vietnamese zen Buddhist sect. Thái Thượng Hoàng typically hold significant power and influence over the Imperial Court and the governing of the country, though it was not the case for the Revival Lê dynasty, as Trịnh lords held real governing power while the Emperor was only a figurehead, making the power of Retired Emperors even more insignificant.

See also 
Minister Mentor

Notes 

Titles
Chinese royal titles
History of Imperial China
History of Japan
History of Korea
History of Vietnam
Ancient Korean institutions